Federico Nicolás Tabeira Arrúa (born 8 February 1996) is a professional Uruguayan football forward currently playing for Atenas de San Carlos in the Uruguayan Primera División.

He made his career league debut for Atenas de San Carlos on 4 May 2013 in an Uruguayan Segunda Division 3-1 away win at Rentistas. He scored his first league goal in Atenas de San Carlos's Uruguayan Segunda Division 3-2 away win against Boston River on 2 November 2013.

External links 
 

Uruguayan footballers
1996 births
Living people
Czech First League players
Association football forwards
Uruguayan expatriate sportspeople in the Czech Republic
Expatriate footballers in the Czech Republic
Atenas de San Carlos players